Sidney Blackhall (born 25 September 1945) is an English former professional footballer who played as a centre forward for Bradford (Park Avenue).

References

1945 births
Living people
English footballers
Association football forwards
Bradford (Park Avenue) A.F.C. players
Ashington A.F.C. players
Sportspeople from Ashington
Footballers from Northumberland
English Football League players